The Underground World (1943) is the sixteenth of seventeen animated Technicolor short films based upon the DC Comics character Superman. Directed by Seymour Kneitel and produced by Famous Studios, the cartoon was originally released to theaters by Paramount Pictures on June 18, 1943. It marks the final appearance of Lois Lane in a Superman cartoon.

Plot 
A local scientist, Dr. Henderson, comes to the Daily Planet with a proposition for Perry White. Several decades earlier, Dr. Henderson's father discovered a series of caverns that he named the "Henderson caves". The elder Dr. Henderson explored the caves for several years before he mysteriously disappeared in them. Now, the younger Dr. Henderson would like to go back into the caverns. He would like the Daily Planet to fund the expedition, and he would like Clark Kent and Lois Lane to come along and report on everything they find. Mr. White agrees.

Several days later, Clark, Lois and Dr. Henderson are at the entrance to the Henderson caves, ready to go spelunking. The caverns are part of a river system, so the only way into the caverns is by boat. Lois and Dr. Henderson take the first boat, and Clark follows later. Inside the cave, Lois and Dr. Henderson row into a large grotto. They dock on the side of the river, but once they step out, the boat drifts off down the river. A sack of dynamite in the boat is accidentally ignited and causes an explosion that Clark, who is just entering the caverns, can hear outside. Sensing danger, Clark paddles faster.

Dr. Henderson and Lois have been captured by a race of "Hawk Men", living in the caverns. The explosion blasted open a hole in their cave, giving them a passage to the surface. Dr. Henderson and Lois are brought before their king. They see a statue of Dr. Henderson's father above the king's throne. Neither of them understands why the Hawk Men have a statue like that or where they got it. The king signals to the others, and Lois and Dr. Henderson are tied to a stone slab.

As Clark enters the cave, he sees Lois and Dr. Henderson being lowered into a giant pot of a bubbling, gold-colored liquid. Seeing the liquid, Lois looks back at the statue of the elder Dr. Henderson, and, suddenly, realizes where it came from. The Hawk Men had fatally coated him in gold metal. Now they were about to do the same thing to Lois and the younger Dr. Henderson. Clark quickly changes into Superman, but before he can save Lois and Dr. Henderson, he must first fight his way through an army of Hawk Men. Once he's finished with the Hawk Men, he saves Lois and Dr. Henderson and wastes no time getting them out of the cave. The Hawk Men chase after them, but Superman uses more dynamite to cover the entrance to their cave with rubble.

Back at the Daily Planet, Mr. White is impressed by Clark and Lois's findings, but he feels no one would believe the story. He burns the report and the photographs taken in the caverns.

Voice cast 
 Bud Collyer as Clark Kent / Superman
 Joan Alexander as Lois Lane
 Julian Noa as Perry White
 Jackson Beck as Narrator, Dr. Henderson

References

External links
 
 The Underground World at the Internet Archive
 

1943 short films
1943 animated films
1940s American animated films
1940s animated short films
1940s animated superhero films
Superman animated shorts
1940s English-language films
Paramount Pictures short films
American animated short films
Animated films about birds